Bin Yauri is a town in the large North-Western state of Kebbi, Nigeria. It is about 8 km to the east from River Niger which feeds the famous Kainji Reservoir and 270 km south of Sokoto State.

Kebbi State